The 1989 GP Ouest-France was the 53rd edition of the GP Ouest-France cycle race and was held on 22 August 1989. The race started and finished in Plouay. The race was won by Jean-Claude Colotti of the RMO team.

General classification

References

1989
1989 in road cycling
1989 in French sport
August 1989 sports events in Europe